K'uchu Hanka (Quechua k'uchu corner, local Quechua hanka snowcapped ridge or peak; ice, "corner peaks", Hispanicized spelling Jochojanca) is a  mountain in the Andes of Peru. It is located in the Huánuco Region, Ambo Province, San Rafael District, and in the Pachitea Province, Panao District. K'uchu Hanka lies north of Wamanripayuq, northwest of the Waqurunchu mountain range.

References

Mountains of Peru
Mountains of Huánuco Region